VNU University of Economics and Business (Vietnamese: Trường Đại học Kinh tế, Đại học Quốc gia Hà Nội) is a member of Vietnam National University, Hanoi. The university was established under Decision 290/QD-TTg of the Prime Minister on 6 March 2007. However, its historical origin dates back to 1974 with the establishment of the Political Economy Department at the University of Hanoi. The college then underwent several transformations before becoming the College of Economics in 2007.

History 

November 1974: Department of Political Economy - University of Hanoi.

September 1995: Department of Economy - College of Social Science and Humanities - Vietnam National University, Hanoi.

July 1999: Department of Economics - Vietnam National University, Hanoi.

March 2007: College of Economics - Vietnam National University, Hanoi.

Training programs 

UEB offers a wide range of studies and applied research with majors in Economics and Business Administration.

1. Undergraduate programs:

Full-time: International Economics, Business Administration, Banking and Finance, Development Economics, Economics and Accounting .
Training program for outstanding students: Political Economy, International Economics.
International training program: Business Administration.
Part-time: International Economics, Business Administration, Banking and Finance.

2. Postgraduate programs:

Master's degree: International Economics, Business Administration, Banking and Finance, Political Economy, Accounting, Economic Management, Public Policy and Development, Management of Financial Organizations.
Doctorate degree: International Economics, Business Administration, Political Economy, Banking and Finance, Economic Management.

3. Joint international programs:

Bachelor of Business Administration (with Troy University, US).
Master of Business Administration (with Troy University and North Central University, US).
Master in Economic Expertise and Management of International Projects (with Paris 12 University, France).
Doctorate in Business Administration (with North Central U., US).
Doctorate in Economics and Business Administration (with Massey University, New Zealand).

External links 
 
 

Universities in Vietnam